The Boreas Plain is an abyssal plain in the South of Fram Strait with water depths of around 3 km at .

References

Oceanic basins of the Arctic Ocean
Abyssal plains